Jeremiah Thompson (1784–1835) was a New York merchant, ship owner, Quaker, officer in the New York Manumission Society (dedicated to freeing slaves). He was co-founder in 1817 of the famous Black Ball Line together with five other men (four of whom were also Quakers) including Isaac Wright. He emigrated to the United States from his native Yorkshire, England in 1801 at the age of seventeen.

References
Stephen Fox, Transatlantic: Samuel Cunard, Isambard Brunel, and the Great Atlantic Steamships, Harper Collins (2003), pp. 3–16
Page at Neptune's Needle - Database of American Maritime History

1784 births
1835 deaths
American abolitionists
American merchants
American Quakers
Quaker abolitionists
English abolitionists
English emigrants to the United States
English Quakers
Place of death missing
Members of the New York Manumission Society
19th-century American businesspeople